The Independent Schools Foundation Academy(The ISF Academy) is a non-profit bilingual (Mandarin and English) private independent school in Hong Kong.  It is also an IBO World School, and offers the IB Middle Years Programme and Diploma Programme.  The campus is in Cyberport, Pokfulam, Hong Kong.

History 
The Independent Schools Foundation was established in January 2000 as a registered charitable organisation to provide a choice of education for international students. The school was co-founded by Charles Kao and Frances Wong. In 2003, the Foundation established a non-profit, private independent school, The Independent Schools Foundation Academy (The ISF Academy), for Foundation Year to Grade 12 to cater for Mandarin and English education in an inquiry-based learning environment.

In August 2003, the school began its temporary campus in Wanchai, with 56 students in Grades 1 to 4.  It set up a second temporary campus in Causeway Bay before moving to a new campus in Pokfulam in July 2007.

In February 2007, the school commenced its Foundation Year program, a preparatory year for students prior to Grade 1. The academic year 2007-08 marked the first full year of its Foundation Year program.

Campus 
The campus opened in August 2007, in the Kong Sin Wan Tsuen Valley in Pokfulam, within the Island South District of Hong Kong Island, on a 13,152 sq. meter site.

References 

International Baccalaureate schools in Hong Kong
Educational institutions established in 2003
2003 establishments in Hong Kong